is a Japanese novelist. His best known works are the light novel series The Pet Girl of Sakurasou and Rascal Does Not Dream of Bunny Girl Senpai, which have received manga and anime adaptations. His debut work was Saga of a World Without God in 2007.

Works

Light novels
Kaguya: Tsuki no Usagi no Gin no Hakobune (2007–2008)
Houkago Idol (2010)
The Pet Girl of Sakurasou (2009–2014)
Rascal Does Not Dream of Bunny Girl Senpai (2014–present)

Anime
The Pet Girl of Sakurasou (2012-2013) – original creator, scriptwriter
M3: The Dark Metal (2014) – scriptwriter
Selector Spread WIXOSS (2014) – scriptwriter
Mobile Suit Gundam: Iron-Blooded Orphans (2015-2017) – scriptwriter
Just Because! (2017) – series composition, scriptwriter
Rascal Does Not Dream of Bunny Girl Senpai (2018) – original creator
Tawawa on Monday 2 (2021) – scriptwriter
Synduality (2023) – original story draft

Manga
Mobile Suit Gundam: Iron-Blooded Orphans Steel Moon (2014–2018) 
Tora Kiss: A School Odyssey (2012–2014)
Mobile Suit Gundam Eight (TBA)

References

Light novelists
1978 births
Living people
21st-century novelists
Writers from Kanagawa Prefecture
20th-century Japanese writers